New Jersey State Federation of Women's Clubs (NJSFWC) was founded in 1894 and is currently located in New Brunswick, New Jersey. NJSFWC is the largest volunteer women's service organization in the state of New Jersey and a member of the General Federation of Women's Clubs. There are approximately 8,000 members in 200 clubs located throughout New Jersey. They provide opportunities for women with education, leadership training, and community service through participation in local clubs. In 1918, the NJSFWC founded the New Jersey College for Women (now Douglass Residential College), and offers scholarships to Douglass students.

History 
 NJSFWC led to the formation of the Palisades Interstate Park Commission to oversee the preservation of The Palisades
 Named the Grassroots Organization of the Year by the New Jersey Highlands Coalition in 2003
 The New Jersey Library Association awarded its "Library Champions Award" to the NJSFWC in 2004
 A 2004 letter writing campaign to state and Federal legislators which secured passage of the Highlands Water Protection and Planning Act

References 

Women's clubs in the United States
Non-profit organizations based in New Jersey
New Brunswick, New Jersey
History of women in New Jersey